Lars Johanson (born 8 March 1936 in Köping, Sweden) is a Swedish Turcologist and linguist, an emeritus professor at the University of Mainz, and docent at the Department of Linguistics and Philology, University of Uppsala, Sweden.

He has been instrumental in transforming the field of Turcology, which was traditionally more philologically oriented, into a linguistic discipline. Apart from his contributions to Turcology, Lars Johanson made a number of pioneering contributions to general linguistics and language typology, in particular to the typology of tense and aspect systems and the theory of language contact.

In the period of 1966–2022 he published about 400 titles, books and scholarly articles. His most important books are Aspekt im Türkischen ('Viewpoint aspect' in Turkish), published in 1971, and Structural factors in Turkic language contacts, published in 2002. His most recent publication, Turkic (Cambridge University Press 2021), constitutes a monumental thousand-page survey of all the Turkic languages in their synchronic, diachronic, typological, areal and cultural dimensions. Chief Editor of the four-volume Encyclopedia of Turkic Languages and Linguistics, to be published online in 2022 by Brill. In 2022 he and Éva Á. Csató published the second revised edition of the standard reference book The Turkic Languages (Routledge).

He has numerous publications also on Turkish literature. He was awarded the Order of Merit of the Republic of Turkey.

He earned his undergraduate and doctoral degree in Turkic Studies at the University of Uppsala. For many years he was a Professor of Turcology at the Department of Oriental Studies of the Johannes Gutenberg University of Mainz. Currently he is an emeritus professor at the University of Mainz and a senior lecturer at the Department of Linguistics and Philology, University of Uppsala, Sweden. A symposium in March 2016 celebrated his career achievements.

He is the editor-in-chief of Turkic Languages.

Early life 
He was born in 1936 in Köping, Sweden. In 1956–1959 he studied German and Scandinavian languages, Sanskrit and Turcology at the University of Uppsala. In 1961 he took an MA exam in German, Scandinavian languages and Slavic Languages at the same university and in 1963 in Turkic languages. In 1966 he took a doctoral degree ("filosofie licentiat") in Turkic Languages at the University of Uppsala with a thesis "Studien zur reichstürkischen Verbalsyntax".

Professional career 
 In 1971, he successfully obtained his degree of 'Habilitation' at the University of Uppsala, based on his thesis '"Aspekt im Türkischen"' .
 In 1981 he was appointed professor in Turcology at the Johannes Gutenberg University of Mainz.

He has been invited as a visiting professor to several universities and research institutes: 
 1997-1998 ILCAA, Tokyo University of Foreign Studies
 2001 Resident at the Swedish Collegium of Advanced Study
 2001 Research Centre for Linguistic Typology, La Trobe University, Melbourne 
 2002 Sonderforschungsbereich 295 of the Deutsche Forschungsgemeinschaft, University of Hamburg
 2002 Max Planck Institute for Evolutionary Anthropology, Leipzig
 2003-2004 guest professor at Bosporus University, Istanbul [Boğaziçi University]
 2006 Resident at the Swedish Collegium of Advanced Study (The Image of Man in Linguistics)
 2006 Kyoto University, Japan
 2006 Yakutsk Academy of Sciences, Yakutsk
 2008-2018 Central University of Nationalities, Beijing (Minzu) Minzu University of China
 2008 University of Szeged, Hungary
 2009-2010 General Linguistics at the University of Zürich University of Zurich

Several Festschriften have been dedicated to Lars Johanson:
 1996 Berta, Árpád, Brendemoen, Bernt and Schönig, Claus (eds.)  Symbolae Turcologicae: Studies in honour of Lars Johanson on his sixtieth birthday 8 March
 1996. Stockholm : Swedish Research Institute in Istanbul (Transactions 6.) Stockholm: Almqvist & Wiksell International.  2002 Demir, Nurettin & Turan, Fikret (eds.) Scholarly depth and accuracy. A festschrift to Lars Johanson. Ankara. .
 2010 Boeschoten, Hendrik and Rentzsch, Julian (eds.) Turcology in Mainz. (Turcologica 82.) Wiesbaden: Harrassowitz. .
 2011 Robbeets, Martine and Cuyckens, Robert (eds.) Shared Grammaticalization. With special focus on the Transeurasian Languages. (Studies in Language Companion Series 132.) Amsterdam & Philadelphia: John Benjamins - catalog/books/slcs.132/main.

He is a member of the "Permanent International Altaistic Conference", "Wissenschaftliche Gesellschaft an der Universität Frankfurt", Honorary Member of the "Körösi Csoma Society", Budapest , Societas Uralo-Altaica, the Royal Society of Arts and Sciences of Uppsala and Honorary Member of the Central Eurasian Studies Society (CESS) Central Eurasian Studies Society.

 Awards 
 1988 Research Award of the Turkish Language Association Turkish Language Association
 1999 Doctor honoris causa of the University of Szeged 
 2004 Turkic World, Turkic Languages Order of Merit (Türk Dünyası Türk Dili Şeref Ödülü), Türk Kültürüne Hizmet Vakfı 
 2008 Order of Merits of the Republic of Turkey (:tr:Türkiye Cumhuriyeti Liyakat Nişan) Order of Merit of the Republic of Turkey

 Publications 
 1971. Aspekt im Türkischen. Vorstudien zu einer Beschreibung des türkeitürkischen Aspektsystems. Studia Turcica Upsaliensia 1. Uppsala: Almqvist & Wiksell. 
 1979. Alttürkisch als ‘dissimilierende Sprache’.  Abhandlungen der Akademie der Wissenschaften und der Literatur, Mainz, Geistes- und sozialwissenschaftliche Klasse, 1979: 3. Wiesbaden: Steiner. 
 1981. Pluralsuffixe im Südwesttürkischen.Abhandlungen der Akademie der Wissenschaften und der Literatur, Mainz, Geistes- und sozialwissenschaftliche Klasse, 1981: 9. Wiesbaden: Steiner. 
 1991. Linguistische Beiträge zur Gesamturkologie. Budapest: Akadémiai Kiadó. 
 1992. Strukturelle Faktoren in türkischen Sprachkontakten. Sitzungsberichte der Wissenschaftlichen Gesellschaft an der J. W. Goethe-Universität Frankfurt am Main, 29:5. Stuttgart: Steiner. 
 1998. with Csató, Éva Á. (eds.) The Turkic Languages. London: Routledge.  Second edition 2006 
 2001.  Discoveries on the Turkic linguistic map. (Swedish Research Institute in Istanbul, Publications 5.) Stockholm: Swedish Research Institute in Istanbul. 
 2002. Structural factors in Turkic language contacts. [With an introduction by Bernard Comrie.] London: Curzon. 
 2010. with Robbeets, Martine (eds.) Transeurasian verbal morphology in a comparative perspective: genealogy, contact, chance.  (Turcologica 78.) Wiesbaden: Harrassowitz. 
 2012 with Robbeets, Martine (eds.) Copies versus cognates in bound morphology. (Brill's Studies in Language, Cognition and Culture 2.) Leiden: Brill. 
 2016 with Éva Á. Csató et al. (eds.) Turks and Iranians: Interactions in Language and History. The Gunnar Jarring Memorial Program at The Swedish Collegium for Advanced Study. (Turcologica 105.) Wiesbaden: Harrassowitz. , 
 2021 Turkic. Cambridge Language Surveys. Cambridge: Cambridge University Press.
 2022 The Turkic Languages'' 2nd revised edition. London and New York: Routledge.

References

Sources 
 Süer Eker, Yayın Değerlendirme: Lars Johanson (2002)- Türk Dili Haritası Üzerinde Keşifler Bilig, Sayı 265, Kış 2014
 Gunnar Jarring, İsveç’te Türkoloji Araştırmaları, Manas Journal

External links 
 Britannica profile

Linguists of Turkic languages
Academic staff of Johannes Gutenberg University Mainz
Linguists from Sweden
Uppsala University alumni
Paleolinguists
Living people
1936 births